Consumer economics is a branch of economics. It is a broad field, principally concerned with microeconomic analysis behavior in units of consumers, families, or individuals (in contrast to traditional economics, which primarily studies government or business units). It sometimes also encompasses family financial planning and policy analysis. The term largely describes what was more commonly called "home economics" in the past.

History
The traditional economists had little interest in analyzing family units. When economic theory was insufficient to explain the phenomenon of women starting to enter the labor force en masse, consumer economics both gained attention and received important contributions from economic theorists. Major theoretical cornerstones include Gary Becker's Household Production Model, time allocation models and Stigler's information search theory. 

Consumer economics concludes the family-unit economists were strongly influenced by the most recent "consumer era"; which was the "Modern Consumer Movement" of the 1970s. The connection between Consumer Economics and consumer-related politics has been overt, although the strength of the connection varies between Universities and individuals.

Many facets of consumer economics are measured regularly by the Federal Reserve System and the Bureau of Economic Analysis and are available for the public.  A number of indicators are published regularly from these and other academic sources, such as personal income, total household debt, and the Consumer Leverage Ratio.

The effect of consumer economics on the economy is another field of study in economics. It is called the "consumer economy", a term known from Hazlitt's 1946 work Economics in One Lesson.

See also 
 Consumer Leverage Ratio
 Family and consumer science

References

Bryant, K. & Zick, C. The Economic Organization of the Household (2006). Cambridge University Press.
Department of Housing and Consumer Economics - University of Georgia

Family economics